The Ambassador of Malaysia to the Federative Republic of Brazil is the head of Malaysia's diplomatic mission to Brazil. The position has the rank and status of an Ambassador Extraordinary and Plenipotentiary and is based in the Embassy of Malaysia, Brasilia.

List of heads of mission

Ambassadors to Brazil

See also
 Brazil–Malaysia relations

References 

 
Brazil
Malaysia